Carsten Ball and Chris Guccione were the defending champions but Ball decided not to participate.
Guccione played alongside Rik de Voest and won the final against Jordan Kerr and Andreas Siljeström 6–1, 6–4.

Seeds

Draw

Draw

References
 Main Draw

Tiburon Challenger - Doubles
2012 Doubles